Roy Erik Berglöf (born 21 March 1953) is a Swedish harness racer and curler.

He is a 1971 Swedish men's curling champion.

Teams

Personal life

References

External links
 

Living people
1953 births
Sportspeople from Karlstad
Swedish male curlers
Swedish curling champions
Swedish harness racers